Bennie Harold Lenox (September 24, 1941 – July 16, 2016) was an American basketball player. He was best known for his college career at Texas A&M.

Lenox, a 6'2 guard, went to Clear Creek High School, where he set school scoring records for points in a game (46) and season (1,051 in his senior season). At Texas A&M, Lenox became the centerpiece of the Aggies offense as a junior and senior. In his junior season, he averaged 23.7 points per game for the Aggies and was named first-team All-Southwest Conference (SWC) and the league's player of the year.

As a senior, Lenox starred for new coach Shelby Metcalf as the Aggies won the SWC and advanced to the 1964 NCAA Tournament. Lenox averaged 20.8 points per game and set the SWC single-game scoring record in his senior year in a match-up against Wyoming (53 points). The record will never be broken, as the conference disbanded in 1996. At the close of the season, he was again named first-team All-SWC and repeated as SWC Player of the Year.

Following the close of his college career, Lenox was drafted by the Baltimore Bullets in the fifth round of the 1964 NBA draft (37th pick overall), however he did not play in the NBA. In 1967 Lenox was hired as an assistant basketball coach at the Aggies' rival, the University of Texas. He left the post in 1973 to enter private business.

Lenox died in his Bertram, Texas home at the age of 74.

References

1941 births
2016 deaths
American men's basketball players
Baltimore Bullets (1963–1973) draft picks
Basketball players from Texas
Guards (basketball)
People from Madisonville, Texas
Texas A&M Aggies men's basketball players
Texas Longhorns men's basketball coaches
People from Bertram, Texas